Shan Vincent de Paul (SVDP) is a Tamil Canadian recording artist and director from Toronto, Ontario. Paul released his debut album "Saviors" in 2016 and his second album "Trigger Happy Heartbreak" along with an EP "SVDP 1" in 2017.

He is part of Toronto-based artist collective, sideways which includes Coleman Hell, La+ch, Mad Dog Jones, and Michah. He is best known for his debut album "Saviors".

Personal life and career
SVDP was born in Jaffna, Sri Lanka and fled the country in his young age due to the civil war and moved to Canada as refugees.

His debut album "Saviors" was released on April 15, 2016.

SVDP has been featured in media outlets such as Highsnobiety, Complex, BBC, CBC, DJBOOTH, Okayplayer, Afropunk, Clash Magazine, and Torontist.

Discography

Studio albums

Singles

2021 "Uyire"(with Yanchan)
2021 "Hard Times"(with TiKA, Prod. La+ch)
2021 "Neeye Oli" (with Navz-47, produced by Santhosh Narayanan)
2021 "Savage"
2021 "Amnesia" (ft. Ami)
2019 "Ex Xo"
 2019 "Funeral"
 2019 "Zen"
 2019 "Warning Shot"
 2019 "Out Alive"
 2019 "Heaven (ft. Navz-47)"
 2018 "Light"
 2016 "Fight for Us"
 2016 "Humble"
 2016 "Buggin'"
 2016 "Thank God"
 2015 "The Island"
 2015 "Outta Love"
 2015 "Crash"
 2015 "Symbiotic"
 2014 "Some Girls"

Awards and nominations

Concert tours 
Headlining

 OH GAWD! Tour (2020) (with Yanchan and DJ Dwell)

References 

Living people
Sri Lankan Tamil people
Canadian people of Sri Lankan Tamil descent
Canadian songwriters
Year of birth missing (living people)